Members of the New South Wales Legislative Council who served from 1869 to 1872 were appointed for life by the Governor on the advice of the Premier. This list includes members between the beginning of the 1869–70 colonial election on 3 December 1869 and the beginning of the 1872 colonial election on 13 February 1872. The President was Sir Terence Murray.

See also
Second Robertson ministry (1868–1870)
Fifth Cowper ministry (1870)
Third Martin ministry (1870–1872)

Notes

References

 

Members of New South Wales parliaments by term
19th-century Australian politicians